Hedleyoconcha  is a genus of small air-breathing land snails, terrestrial pulmonate gastropod mollusks in the subfamily Charopinae of the family Charopidae.

Species
Species within the genus Hedleyoconcha include:
 Hedleyoconcha addita Iredale, 1944
 Hedleyoconcha ailaketoae Stanisic, 1990
 Hedleyoconcha delta (L. Pfeiffer, 1857)
Species brought into synonymy
 Hedleyoconcha duona Iredale, 1937: synonym of Hedleyoconcha delta (L. Pfeiffer, 1857) (junior synonym)

References

 
Charopidae
Taxonomy articles created by Polbot